Joseph or Joe Fowler may refer to:
Joseph-A. Fowler (1845–1917), Canadian composer, organist, choirmaster, pianist, and music educator
Joseph S. Fowler (1820–1902), United States Senator from Tennessee
Joe Fowler (1894–1993), United States Naval Admiral who had an important part in the building of Walt Disney World
Boob Fowler (Joseph Chester Fowler, 1900–1988), Major League Baseball shortstop